Jadranovo is a small coastal town in the northern coast of Croatia. Tourism here has flourished due to its proximity to Crikvenica.

Geography 
Jadranovo is at approximately 45°10′N 14°41′E. This is 8 km from Crikvenica and 26 km from Rijeka. Jadranovo is on the sunny northern Adriatic coast and is divided into two parts by a small peninsula. This peninsula contains the Bay of Lokvišće.

History 

The favourable climate of Jadranovo has already attracted early settlers. The oldest finds at the archaeological ruins of Lokvišće date back to the Stone Age (6500 BC - 4000 BC).

In the Bay of Lokvišće, there were found a large number of broken amphorae. This indicates that Lokvišće was a small port with warehouses for the production and storage of wine and olive oil.

In the 8th and 9th Century this area was populated by Croats, from the northern region of Dalmatia. The site of today’s Jadranovo was named St. James (Sveti Jakov) on a map of Iacoppa de Giroldisa in the year 1426. 
 
On June 14, 1952 the name Sv. Jakov – Šiljevica was abolished.  In a referendum in 1954 the new name Jadranovo was chosen (other proposed names were: Ribarevo, Lovorovo, Zidarevo, Radenovo).  The inhabitants were continued to be referred to as Jakovari even after the name change to Jadranovo.

Economy 
Tourism is the largest part of the economy in Jadranovo.  Although Jadranovo does not have a large capacity hotel, thanks to private accommodation arranged in rooms and apartments, Jadranovo can accommodate up to three thousand guests. During the summer there are fun events like the traditional fishermen's festival. Saint James's Feast is also celebrated on July 25 with live music.

Population
Jadranovo has 1,224 inhabitants (2011 census).

References 

Populated places in Primorje-Gorski Kotar County
Roman towns and cities in Croatia